Albany College of Pharmacy and Health Sciences (formerly Albany College of Pharmacy) is a private, independent college with campuses in Albany, New York and Colchester, Vermont. ACPHS was named the #1 Value-Added college or university in the country in the 2019 rankings published by The Wall Street Journal/Times Higher Education.  According to the 2018 College Scorecard, the median salary of ACPHS students ten years after entering school is $124,700, the second highest figure among the 3,871 schools that make up the College Scorecard database.  As of 2015, it was tied as the 58th-ranked pharmacy school in the US. 

ACPHS is home to approximately 1,400 students and 115 full-and-part time faculty. The College's academic programs includes five Bachelor's programs, five Master's programs, and the Doctor of Pharmacy (Pharm.D.).

History
On June 12, 1881, Albany College of Pharmacy was founded as the nation's 14th pharmacy program. Dr. E.N. Potter, then President of Union University, approved the formation of the College at Union University's annual board meeting.

Along with Albany Medical College, Albany Law School, the Dudley Observatory, and Union College, ACPHS remains one of the constituent entities of Union University, though like each member, it has its own Board of Trustees, is fiscally independent, and is responsible for its own programs.

Recent historical milestones include:

On September 30, 2002, the Pharmaceutical Research Institute (PRI) at Albany College of Pharmacy and Health Sciences was established. This center for drug discovery and development is located in Rensselaer, NY, and is led by Vice Provost for Research Shaker A. Mousa. 
On October 16, 2008, Albany College of Pharmacy changed its name to Albany College of Pharmacy and Health Sciences to reflect its expanding range of academic programs.
On August 31, 2009, the College opened a campus in Colchester, Vermont. It is the only pharmacy program in the state.
On March 30, 2016, ACPHS opened New York State's first “student operated pharmacy” when College Hometown Pharmacy began operations in the Hometown Health Centers clinic located at 1044 State Street in Schenectady, NY.
On January 25, 2017, ACPHS opened its second student operated pharmacy located at 20 Warren Street in Albany's South End (less than two miles from the campus).

Campuses

Albany Campus
The ACPHS Albany Campus is located at 106 New Scotland Avenue in the University Heights section of Albany, a higher education and health care cluster that includes Albany Law School, Albany Medical College, and Sage College of Albany, as well as Albany Medical Center, St. Peter's Hospital, and the Albany Stratton VA Medical Center.

The Albany campus is composed of eight buildings:

Francis J. O’Brien Building – Opened in 1927, this building is home to lecture halls, research and teaching labs, faculty and administrative offices, and the Throop Pharmacy Museum.
Gozzo Student Center – Opened in 2006, the Student Center features a dining hall, bookstore, and two large lecture halls.
Albert M. White Gymnasium – The home court for the men's and women's basketball teams and a variety of intramural and recreational activities.
Library Building – The bottom two floors are dedicated to the library while the top floor contains a range of student support services.
Biosciences Research Building – This former Bender Hygienic Laboratories building is home to the Department of Pharmaceutical Sciences and houses a number of research laboratories.
Holland Building – This multi-purpose building includes classrooms, teaching laboratories, faculty and staff offices, and residence suites.
Notre Dame Hall – A residence hall primarily for second year students.
South Hall – A residence hall primarily for first year students.

Vermont Campus
The ACPHS Vermont Campus was located at 261 Mountain View Drive in Colchester. The Vermont Campus offered the professional pharmacy program and a two-year master's degree in Pharmaceutical Sciences. The campus was shut down in June 2021 due to decline in enrollment.

Academic programs

Bachelor's programs
Bachelor of Science in Biomedical Technology 
Bachelor of Science in Clinical Laboratory Sciences 
Bachelor of Science in Microbiology
 Bachelor of Science in Pharmaceutical Sciences
Bachelor of Science in Public Health

Professional program
Doctor of Pharmacy (Pharm.D.) – offered on Albany and Vermont Campuses

Master's programs
Master of Science in Clinical Laboratory Sciences
Master of Science in Cytotechnology and Molecular Cytology
Master of Science in Health Outcomes and Informatics
Master of Science in Molecular Biosciences
Master of Science in Pharmaceutical Sciences – offered on Albany and Vermont Campuses

Dual degree programs
Each of the college's four dual degree programs allows students to earn a bachelor's degree and a master's degree from ACPHS in five years:

B.S. in Biomedical Technology / M.S. in Clinical Laboratory Sciences
B.S. in Biomedical Technology / M.S. in Cytotechnology and Molecular Cytology
B.S. in Pharmaceutical Sciences / M.S. in Pharmaceutical Sciences
B.S. in Microbiology / M.S. in Molecular Biosciences

Academic affiliation agreements
ACPHS students are able to pursue additional degree options (e.g., M.D., P.A., M.B.A., J.D.) through the College's affiliation agreements with other colleges and universities. Additional agreements are in place that allow qualified students from other colleges and universities to pursue degrees from ACPHS.

Athletics
The ACPHS athletic teams are called the Panthers. The college is a member of the United States Collegiate Athletic Association (USCAA), primarily competing in the Yankee Small College Conference (YSCC) since the 2020–21 academic year. The Panthers previously competed as a founding member of the Hudson Valley Intercollegiate Athletic Conference (HVIAC) from 2004–05 to 2018–19; as well as an USCAA Independent during the 2019–20 school year.

ACPHS competes in eight intercollegiate varsity sports (all on the Albany Campus): Men's sports include basketball, cross country, soccer and track & field; while women's sports include basketball, cross country, soccer and track & field. Club sports include golf, hockey, lacrosse and tennis.

Accomplishments
The women's basketball team won the school's only national championship in 2013 when it defeated Berkeley College 60-54 to win the USCAA Division II National Championship.

Facilities
The ACPHS track and field was renovated in 2012 at a cost of $2.5 million.

References

External links
Official website
Official athletics website

Private universities and colleges in New York (state)
Private universities and colleges in Vermont
Pharmacy schools in New York (state)
Pharmacy schools in Vermont
Educational institutions established in 1881
Universities and colleges in Albany County, New York
USCAA member institutions
1881 establishments in New York (state)